The 1994 Supertaça Cândido de Oliveira was the 16th edition of the Supertaça Cândido de Oliveira, the annual Portuguese football season-opening match contested by the winners of the previous season's top league and cup competitions (or cup runner-up in case the league- and cup-winning club is the same). The 1994 Supertaça Cândido de Oliveira was contested over two legs, and opposed Benfica and Porto of the Primeira Liga. Benfica qualified for the SuperCup by winning the 1993–94 Primeira Divisão, whilst Porto qualified for the Supertaça by winning the 1993–94 Taça de Portugal.

The first leg which took place at the Estádio da Luz, saw 1–1 result as Rui Filipe scored for Porto and Vítor Paneira for Benfica. The second leg which took place at the Estádio das Antas finished goalless (1–1 on aggregate), which led to the Supertaça being replayed in June 1995. The replay which took place at Paris Saint-Germain's Parc des Princes in France, saw the Dragões defeat the Encarnados 1–0 thanks to Domingos Paciência goal which would claim the Portistas an eighth Supertaça.

First leg

Details

Second leg

Details

Replay

Details

References

Supertaça Cândido de Oliveira
1994–95 in Portuguese football
S.L. Benfica matches
FC Porto matches